El Roble may refer to:
 El Roble, Coclé, Panama
 El Roble, California, United States
 El Roble de Ilobasco, a Salvadoran football club